Sky Princess may refer to:

Kingdom Coaster, a wooden roller coaster in Dutch Wonderland near Lancaster, Pennsylvania, opened in 1992 and called the Sky Princess before 2007
Atlantic Star (cruise ship), an Australian cruise ship formerly known as Sky Princess, built in 1984, laid up in 2010, sold to shipbreaker in Aliağa, Turkey, and renamed Antic
 Sky Princess (2019), a Royal-class cruise ship operating for Princess Cruises since October 2019